The Main Event is a 1927 American silent romantic drama film directed by William K. Howard and starring Vera Reynolds. It was produced by Cecil B. DeMille and released through Pathé Exchange.

Cast

See also
Rough House Rosie (1927)

Preservation status
A print of The Main Event is preserved in the French archive Centre national du cinéma et de l'image animée in Fort de Bois-d'Arcy and the Museum of Modern Art.

References

External links

1927 films
American silent feature films
Films directed by William K. Howard
Pathé Exchange films
American black-and-white films
American romantic drama films
1927 romantic drama films
1920s American films
Silent romantic drama films
Silent American drama films